Hiram Krum House is a historic home located at Glens Falls, Warren County, New York.  It was built about 1865 and is a -story, three- by five-bay, irregularly shaped brick residence in a transitional Italianate / Second Empire style.  It features a mansard roof.

In 2016, a sign outside the building reads: "Finch Paper, LLC: Woodlands Headquarters."

It was added to the National Register of Historic Places in 1984.

See also
 National Register of Historic Places listings in Warren County, New York

References

Houses on the National Register of Historic Places in New York (state)
Second Empire architecture in New York (state)
Italianate architecture in New York (state)
Houses completed in 1865
Houses in Warren County, New York
National Register of Historic Places in Warren County, New York